Gemixystus calcareus is a species of sea snail, a marine gastropod mollusk, in the family Muricidae, the murex snails or rock snails.

Description
The length of the shell attains 5.4 mm.

Distribution
This marine species occurs off the Chesterfield Archipelago, New Caledonia.

References

 Houart R. & Héros V. (2019). The genus Gemixystus Iredale, 1929 (Gastropoda: Muricidae: Trophoninae) in New Caledonia with the description of two new species and some notes on the genus in the Indo-West Pacific. Novapex. 20(1-2): 1-12

External links
 Houart, R.; Héros, V. (2012). New species of Muricidae (Gastropoda) and additional or noteworthy records from the western Pacific. Zoosystema. 34(1), 21-37.

calcareus
Gastropods described in 2012